is a station along the Kanazawa Seaside Line, located in Kanazawa-ku, Yokohama, Japan. It opened on 5 July 1989.

Station Layout
This elevated station consists of a single island platform serving two tracks.

Adjacent stations

Surrounding area
Yokohama City University, School of Medicine (Fukuura Campus) and the University Hospital

Railway stations in Kanagawa Prefecture
Kanazawa Seaside Line
Railway stations in Japan opened in 1989